Janville is the name or part of the name of several communes in France:

Janville, Calvados, in the Calvados département 
Janville, Eure-et-Loir, in the Eure-et-Loir département 
Janville, Oise, in the Oise département
Janville-sur-Juine, in the Essonne département